Joël Gauvin (born 24 July 1939) is a French former ice hockey defenceman. He competed in the men's tournament at the 1968 Winter Olympics.

References

External links

1939 births
Living people
Brûleurs de Loups players
French ice hockey defencemen
Ice hockey players at the 1968 Winter Olympics
Olympic ice hockey players of France
Ours de Villard-de-Lans players
People from Briançon
Sportspeople from Hautes-Alpes